Gilbert Austin (1753–1837) was an Irish educator, clergyman and author. Austin is best known for his 1806 book on chironomia, Chironomia, or a Treatise on Rhetorical Delivery. Heavily influenced by classical writers, Austin stressed the importance of voice and gesture to a successful oration.

Biographical information
Gilbert Austin was born in 1753 in County Louth, Ireland. Educated at Trinity College, Dublin, Austin received his Bachelor of Arts degree in 1774 and his Master of Arts degree in 1780. After graduating, Austin established a private school in Dublin where he taught the sons of Ireland's elite, including Augustus Frederick FitzGerald, later Third Duke of Leinster (Robb and Thonssen 1966:xv-xvi). Austin inscribed his best-known work, Chironomia, or a Treatise on Rhetorical Delivery, to another of his former pupils, Francis William Caulfeild, Earl of Charlemont.

An active member of the Royal Irish Academy, Austin wrote several scientific papers describing his inventions. In 1789, Austin edited and published a collection of poems by Irish writer Thomas Dermody. Austin also published a number of his sermons, including the collection Sermons on Practical Subjects. Austin began work on his most famous book, Chironomia, in the 1770s but it was not published until 1806.

Austin held several clerical appointments in the Church of Ireland. In 1798, Austin became a minor canon of St. Patrick's Cathedral, Dublin. From 1816 until his death in 1837, Austin was Vicar of Laraghbryan (or Maynooth), a living to which he was presented by his former pupil, the Duke of Leinster. Austin also held the prebendary of Blackrath from 1821 to 1835 (Robb and Thonssen 1966:xvi). He served as chaplain to the Magdalen Asylum, Leeson-Street, Dublin.

Works

Scientific articles
Between 1790 and 1803, Austin published three articles in the Transactions of the Royal Irish Academy. Philippa Spoel (1998) writes, "these articles, which describe the construction and application of chemical apparatus invented by Austin, demonstrate his involvement...with the flourishing field of chemistry" (7). The inventions Austin described include a portable barometer, a mechanism for filling water with carbon dioxide, and an apparatus for collecting gasses over water and mercury. In 1813, Austin published "On a New Construction of a Condenser and Air-Pump" in the Philosophical Transactions of the Royal Society of London.

Sermons and other writing
In 1789, Austin edited and published Thomas Dermody's first collection of poetry, Poems.
In 1794, Austin published A Sermon on a Future State: Combating the Opinion that "Death is Eternal Sleep." American author Edgar Allan Poe (1844) described Austin's sermon as "nearly, if not quite the best 'Essay on a Future State' " (584). Austin published Sermons on Practical Subjects in 1795 and A Sermon for the Support of Mercer's Hospital in 1796.

Chironomia, or a Treatise on Rhetorical Delivery
In the preface to Chironomia, Austin writes
...it is a fact, that we do not possess from the ancients, nor yet from the labours of our own countrymen, any sufficiently detailed and precise precepts for the fifth division of the art of rhetoric, namely rhetorical delivery, called by the ancients actio and pronuntiatio. (ix)
Austin observed that British orators were skilled in the first four divisions of rhetoric: inventio, dispositio, elocutio, and memoria. However, the fifth division, pronuntiatio or delivery, was all but ignored. Delivery, which is often improperly referred to as elocution (elocutio), concerns the use of voice and gesture in an oration. Rather than study the art of delivery, orators trusted to the inspiration of the moment to guide their voices and gestures. Austin describes this as a reliance on "gestures imperfectly conceived...which will consequently be imperfectly executed" (5).

Chironomia is a treatise on the importance of good delivery. Good delivery, Austin notes, can "conceal in some degree the blemishes of the composition, or the matter delivered, and...add lustre to its beauties" (187). In the first part of the book, Austin traces the study of the art of delivery from the classical world to the 18th century. The second part of the book is devoted to a description of the notation system Austin designed to teach students of rhetoric the management of gesture and voice. The system of notation is accompanied by a series of illustrations depicting positions of the feet, body and hands.

Throughout Chironomia, Austin instructs speakers to avoid the appearance of vulgarity or rusticity. Austin first developed the system of notation described in Chironomia at his school for privileged young men. Austin's goal was to prepare his students for a life in the church or politics by training them to become better orators. Although Austin's system was eventually dismissed as too rigidly prescriptive, Chironomia was a highly influential book during the 19th century.

Influences
Discussing the need for a treatise on delivery, Austin writes "during my examination of modern writers, it has appeared to me, that, with little exception, they have neglected to pay due attention to the precepts and authority of the great and ancient masters" (v). Austin remedies this oversight by compiling a collection of classical sources on the art of delivery. Austin was heavily influenced by Cicero and Quintilian. Cicero refers to action as the "language of the body" and the art of delivery as "corporeal eloquence" (Austin [1806] 1966:1). Austin attributes to Quintilian the use of the word chironomia to refer to the art of gesture (2). In Chironomia, Austin quotes extensively from Cicero's De oratore and Quintilian's Institutio oratoria.

Austin also cites Ludovicus Cressolius's 1620 book Vacationes Autumales sive de perfecta Oratoris, Actione, et Pronuntiatione and the work of Caussinus as influences. Despite their use of the term elocution for the art Austin calls delivery, Austin refers to Thomas Sheridan's Lectures on Elocution (1762) and John Walker's Elements of Elocution (1781) in his discussion of voice and countenance.

Austin's work would appear to be a direct descendant of John Bulwer's book Chirologia, or, the Natural Language of the Hand which, when it was published in 1644, also included Bulwer's work Chironomia; or, the Art of Manual Rhetoricke. However, Austin does not mention Bulwer anywhere in his Chironomia. Robb and Thonssen (1966) suggest this is because Austin was unfamiliar with Bulwer's book (xi).

Voice and countenance
Austin was concerned with both the quality and management of the voice; he considered the former a gift of nature and the latter a matter of art (29). Austin developed rules for the management of articulation, pronunciation and emphasis. On articulation, Austin writes [words] are to be delivered out from the lips, as beautiful coins newly issued from the mint, deeply and accurately impressed, perfectly finished, neatly struck by the proper organs, distinct, sharp, in due succession and of due weight. (38) Austin agreed with Sheridan's advice that good articulation consisted of pronouncing each syllable distinctly and with proper emphasis (37). Austin's rules for pronunciation address the issue of the provincial accent, something Austin labels "a stain of rusticity" (47). Austin encouraged his students to rid themselves of their provincial accent in favour of a courtly accent.

In addition to his rules for the management of the voice, Austin also addresses issues of vocal quality including pitch, volume and variety. Austin was also concerned with the management of facial expression. Austin stresses the importance of using appropriate tones of voice, facial expressions and gestures to convey sincerity.

Gesture
Austin describes gesture as the "action and position of all the parts of the body" (133) and attributes to gesture the power to convey meaning. During the 18th century, speakers preferred the natural style of gesture but Austin warns against this style saying that speakers who rely on nature run the risk of displaying "the untutored extravagance and uncouth motions of the vulgar" (138 see Plate 2, Figures 8 and 9 below). By following Austin's guidelines, speakers could improve their delivery by matching their gestures to their words. Austin advises his students, however, that gesture should be used with restraint and only when appropriate (137).

System of notation
Austin's system of notation begins with the placement of the body in an imaginary sphere (see Plate 2, Fig. 18 below). The speaker then moves his or her body, feet or hands toward one of the points on the sphere. Each movement is assigned a notation that specifies the direction and manner in which the speaker should move. The speaker should include these notations in the text of his or her speech so that he or she knows when and how to move. Notation regarding the hands is written above the sentence; notation regarding the feet is written below. For instance, the notation Bcl. e f sh. above a word indicates that the speaker should clasp both hands and extend them forward at shoulder height in a shaking motion (see Plate 8, Fig. 75 below).  The notation L 1 x under a word indicates that the speaker should advance the left foot and bend the right knee. Austin also provides a notation system for the voice. Notation marks are placed at the beginning of a passage and then throughout the text whenever the speaker is to change the tone or rapidity of his or her vocal delivery.

Illustrations
The text of Chironomia is accompanied by 12 engraved plates depicting various positions of the feet, arms and body. Austin credits George Chinnery as the original artist but claims that he could not afford to pay Chinnery to complete the engravings. An anonymous young man was employed to alter and complete the plates (Austin [1806] 1966:viii).

Influence and criticism
Robb and Thonssen (1966) write, "until the teaching of [François] Delsarte...Austin was the authority on teaching gesture" (xvii). With the publication of Chironomia, Austin's influence extended beyond his own school to classrooms throughout Britain and America. By the end of the 19th century, however, Chironomia had fallen from favour. Austin's method was considered too mechanical for modern tastes. G. P. Mohrmann (1968) claims the misperception of Chironomia as rigidly prescriptive is due to a lack of critical analysis of Austin's method (18). Spoel (1998) describes Chironomia as "a unique socially and historically situated representation of bodily discipline" (5). Chironomia remains of interest to scholars not only for its insight into late-18th and early-19th century rhetorical practices but also for its collection of classical writings on delivery.

Further reading
Austin, Gilbert. "Description of an Apparatus for Impregnating Water and Other Substances Strongly with Carbonic Acid Gas." Transactions of the Royal Irish Academy 1799. 131-34.
---. "Description of an Apparatus for Transferring Gasses Over Water or Mercury." Transactions of the Royal Irish Academy 1803. 3–9.
---. "Description of a Portable Barometer." Transactions of the Royal Irish Academy 1790. 99–105.
---. "On a New Construction of a Condenser and Air-Pump." Philosophical Transactions of the Royal Society of London 1813. 138–145.
Dermody, Thomas. Poems. Dublin: 1789. New York: Garland, 1978. 
Howell, Wilbur Samuel. Eighteenth-Century British Logic and Rhetoric. Princeton: Princeton UP, 1971.
Wentz, Jed. "Revaluing Gilbert's Austin's Chironomia (1806) as a source for historical acting techniques". 'Theatrical Heritage'. Leuven University Press, 2015.

Resources
Austin, Gilbert. Chironomia, or a Treatise on Rhetorical Delivery. London: 1806. Ed. Mary Margaret Robb and Lester Thonssen. Carbondale, IL: Southern Illinois UP, 1966.
Mohrmann, G. P., "The Real Chironomia." Southern Speech Journal 34 (Autumn 1968): 17–27.
Poe, Edgar Allan. "Marginalia." Democratic Review December 1844. 580–594.
Robb, Mary Margaret and Lester Thonssen. "Editor's Introduction." Austin, Chironomia ix–xxi.
Spoel, Philippa M. "The Science of Bodily Rhetoric in Gilbert Austin's Chironomia." Rhetoric Society Quarterly 28 (Autumn 1998): 5–27.

External links
Animated graphic based on illustrations from Chironomia

Irish non-fiction writers
People from County Louth
Rhetoricians
1753 births
1837 deaths